is a Japan-exclusive video game based on All Japan Women's Pro-Wrestling, and is an installment of the Fire Pro Wrestling series. It was released exclusively for the Super Famicom, although an unofficial English translation exists.

Gameplay

Every wrestler has three different variations of moves that work at different times; grappling only become available to the player after using the strongest move to weaken the opponent. Creating up to 16 customized wrestlers is a possibility; with a generous display of wardrobe options. The referee has the ability to be knocked out. He cannot do pinfalls or count out opponents who are outside the ring while unconscious. Like in actual wrestling, rope breaks can be ordered by the referee.

This game features genuine female professional wrestlers from All Japan Women's Pro-Wrestling; unlike the non-Joshi Fire Pro games which featured carbon copies with false names. Bull Nakano and Akira Hokuto can be unlocked for completing the challenge mode. While lacking in a proper story line, players can choose from a variety of gimmick matches.

Reception
On release, Famicom Tsūshin scored the game a 29 out of 40.

See also

List of licensed wrestling video games

References

1995 video games
Fire Pro Wrestling
Human Entertainment games
Japan-exclusive video games
Super Nintendo Entertainment System games
Video games featuring female protagonists
Multiplayer and single-player video games
TurboGrafx-CD games
Video games developed in Japan
Professional wrestling games